Neparholaspis monticola is a species of mite in the family Parholaspididae.

References

Parholaspididae
Articles created by Qbugbot
Animals described in 1979